The Arab Women's Cup is an international football competition contested by the senior women's national teams of the members of the Union of Arab Football Associations (UAFA), the sport's governing body for countries in the Arab world.

The competition has been held twice, in 2006 in Alexandria, and in 2021 in Cairo, both in Egypt, with seven teams participating. Algeria defeated Morocco 1–0 to win the inaugural competition.

Results

a.e.t.: after extra time
p: after penalty shoot-out
TBD: to be determined

Summary

Overall team records
In this ranking 3 points are awarded for a win, 1 for a draw and 0 for a loss. As per statistical convention in football, matches decided in extra time are counted as wins and losses, while matches decided by penalty shoot-outs are counted as draws.  Teams are ranked by total points, then by goal difference, then by goals scored.

Comprehensive team results by tournament
Legend

 – Champions
 – Runners-up
 – Third place
 – Fourth place
 – Semi-final (no third place match)

GS – Group stage
 — Qualified for upcoming tournament
 — Did not participate
 — Hosts

See also 
FIFA Arab Cup
Arab U-17 Women's Cup
2010 Arabia Women's Cup

References

External links
Arab Women's Cup at Kooora.com

 
Union of Arab Football Associations competitions
International association football competitions in Africa
International association football competitions in the Middle East
Women's international association football competitions
Recurring sporting events established in 2006